Koi Mere Dil Mein Hai is a 2005 Indian Bollywood film directed by Deepak Ramsay. It stars Priyanshu Chatterjee and Dia Mirza in pivotal roles.

Plot
The wealthy Malhotra consists of Vikram, his wife, and son, Raj. They would like Raj to marry their friend, Ishwarchand Mangatram Gore's only U.S. based daughter, Simran. But Raj is intent on finding his very own soul-mate - which he does in his sister's tutor, Asha, who comes from a poor family, and is refusing to accept any advances from him. On the other hand, Simran too refuses to marry Raj, as she is in love with Sameer, an up-coming singer. When Simran is summoned to India, and introduced to Raj, both plan to get their marriage cancelled. While both attempt to woo their sweethearts, they find that Sameer is Asha's betrothed. Both Simran and Raj must now come up with a plan so separate the two - and they eventually succeed. Raj's marriage is fixed with Asha. On the marriage eve a guilty Raj confess to Sameer about how he and Simran had managed to separate him from Asha. Sameer forgives Raj and ask him to go ahead with this marriage and he also requests him not to reveal truth to Asha as it may break her completely. Simran who is also ashamed and guilty confesses to Sameer that she has realized her true love for Raj though it's too late. After the marriage, Raj confesses to Asha that he has realized his true feelings for Simran; only to be surprised that the bride behind the veil is Simran and he has married Simran not Asha. When Simran confessed her feelings for Raj in front of Sameer, Raj's father had overheard their conversation and it was his plan to swap the bride. the film ends with Sameer and Asha's union and they eventually forgive Raj and Simran.

Cast
 Priyanshu Chatterjee as Raj Malhotra
 Dia Mirza as Simran Gore
 Kader Khan as Vikram Malhotra
 Rakesh Bapat as Sameer Khan
 Neha Bajpai as Asha Thakur
 Reema Lagoo as Mrs. Vikram Malhotra
 Sadashiv Amrapurkar as Ishwarchand Mangatram Gore (I.M. Gore)
 Himani Shivpuri as Mrs. Ishwarchand Mangatram Gore
 Rita Bhaduri as Asha's mother
 Amrita Prakash as Soni Malhotra- Raj's sister

Soundtrack

References

External links
 

2000s Hindi-language films
2005 films
Films scored by Nikhil-Vinay